Leslie Thorne (23 June 1916 in Greenock, Inverclyde – 13 July 1993 in Troon, South Ayrshire) was a British racing driver from Scotland. He participated in one Formula One World Championship Grand Prix, 1954 British Grand Prix, where he finished 14th and scored no championship points. Thorne also competed in several non-Championship Formula One races.

After his motor-racing career he settled down as a chartered accountant.

Complete Formula One World Championship results
(key)

References

1916 births
1993 deaths
Scottish racing drivers
Scottish Formula One drivers
Ecurie Ecosse Formula One drivers
Sportspeople from Greenock